Yogi's Gang is an American animated television series and the second incarnation of the Yogi Bear franchise, which aired 16 half-hour episodes on ABC from , to . The show began as Yogi's Ark Lark, a special TV movie on The ABC Saturday Superstar Movie in 1972. Fifteen original episodes were produced for broadcast on ABC, with the hour-long Yogi's Ark Lark thrown in as a split-in-half two-parter. The show confronted social and cultural issues like ecology and bigotry, with villains named Mr. Waste, Dr. Bigot, the Envy Brothers, Lotta Litter, the Greedy Genie and Mr. Cheater.

After a successful run on Saturday mornings, episodes of Yogi's Gang were serialized on the syndicated weekday series, Fred Flintstone and Friends in 1977–78. In the late 1980s, repeats were shown on USA Cartoon Express and later resurfaced on Nickelodeon, Cartoon Network and Boomerang.

Yogi's Gang is the only Yogi Bear show to have a laugh track.

Plot
Yogi, Quick Draw, Huck and the rest of the gang encounter a variety of villains such as Captain Swashbuckle Swipe, Smokestack Smog, Lotta Litter, the Envy Brothers, Mr. Hothead, Dr. Bigot (and his henchmen Professor Haggling and Professor Bickering), the Gossipy Witch of the West, J. Wantum Vandal, the Sheik of Selfishness, Commadore Phineas P. Fibber, I.M. Sloppy, Peter D. Cheater, Mr. Waste, Hilarious P. Prankster, and the Greedy Genie, who act as their friends, hosts and/or guests, but embody some of the most common human faults and vices. Yogi and crew would often put up with them which ends with the villains either being repelled or outdone by their actions.

Characters
 Atom Ant
 Augie Doggie and Doggie Daddy
 The Hillbilly Bears
 Hokey Wolf and Ding-A-Ling Wolf
 Huckleberry Hound
 Lippy the Lion and Hardy Har Har
 Magilla Gorilla
 Peter Potamus and So-So
 Pixie and Dixie and Mr. Jinks
 Punkin' Puss & Mushmouse
 Quick Draw McGraw & Baba Looey
 Ricochet Rabbit & Droop-a-Long
 Secret Squirrel and Morocco Mole
 Snagglepuss
 Snooper and Blabber
 Squiddly Diddly
 Touché Turtle and Dum Dum
 Wally Gator
 Yakky Doodle
 Yogi Bear and Boo-Boo Bear

Voices
 Daws Butler as Yogi Bear, Augie Doggie, Huckleberry Hound, Quick Draw McGraw, Snagglepuss, Wally Gator, Peter Potamus, Baba Looey, Lippy the Lion, Hokey Wolf, Tantrum
 Don Messick as Boo Boo Bear, Squiddly Diddly, Touché Turtle, Ranger Smith, Atom Ant, Mayor of Smog City, Temper
 Julie Bennett as Cindy Bear
 John Stephenson as Doggie Daddy, Hardy Har Har, Scoots, Mr. Cheerful, Greedy Genie, Hilarious P. Prankster, Envy Brother #2, Captain Swashbuckle Swipe, Fumbo Jumbo the Masked Avenger, Mr. Hothead, Professor Bickering
 Allan Melvin as Magilla Gorilla, Mr. Sloppy/Mr. Neat, Professor Haggling
 Henry Corden as Paw Rugg, Dr. Bigot, Chief Short
 Jean Vander Pyl as Maw Rugg
 Josh Albee - Freddy, Jimmy
 Tom Bosley as Commadore Phineas P. Fibber
 Walker Edmiston
 Virginia Gregg as  Gossipy Witch of the West
 Jim MacGeorge
 Rose Marie as  Lotta Litter
 Hal Smith as J. Wanton Vandal, Smiley the Hobo
 Lennie Weinrib as Smokestack Smog
 Jesse White as Peter D. Cheater
 Paul Winchell as Sheik of Selfishness

Episodes

Home media
The "Mr. Bigot" episode is available on the DVD Saturday Morning Cartoons: 1970s Vol. 2. On February 19, 2013, Warner Archive released Yogi's Gang: The Complete Series on DVD in NTSC picture format with all region encoding, as part of their Hanna-Barbera Classics Collection. This is a Manufacture-on-Demand (MOD) release, available exclusively through Warner's online store, Walmart.com and Amazon.com. Yogi's Gang: The Complete Series is also available for download via iTunes Store and Google Play Store.

Other appearances
The different villains in this show have made appearances in Jellystone! In "Jailcation", Hilarious P. Prankster appears as an inmate of Santo Relaxo. In "Balloon Kids", Captain Swashbuckle Swipe (voiced by Bernardo de Paula), Lotta Litter (voiced by Georgie Kidder), Mr. Smog (voiced by C.H. Greenblatt), and the Gossipy Witch of the West (voiced by Dana Snyder) appear as a group of sky pirates. Mr. Hothead appears in the episode "Heroes and Capes".

See also
 List of works produced by Hanna-Barbera Productions
 Yogi's Ark Lark
 The Yogi Bear Show
 Yogi's Space Race
 Galaxy Goof-Ups
 List of Hanna-Barbera characters
 Yogi Bear (character)

References

External links
 
 
 
 The Cartoon Scrapbook – Information and details on Yogi's Gang.

Yogi Bear television series
Huckleberry Hound television series
1970s American animated television series
1973 American television series debuts
1975 American television series endings
American animated television spin-offs
American Broadcasting Company original programming
American children's animated adventure television series
American children's animated comedy television series
American children's animated fantasy television series
Crossover animated television series
Animated television series about squirrels
English-language television shows
Television series by Hanna-Barbera
Television about magic